Franca Falcucci (22 March 1926 – 4 September 2014) was an Italian politician, member of the Christian Democracy Party. She served at the Senate and was the first woman to become minister of public education.

Biography
Born in Rome in 1926, Falcucci taught Latin and Greek in Roman lyceums before becoming a politician in 1968.

In 1974, the Minister of Education Franco Maria Malfatti asked Falcucci to chair a team in charge of researching the problems of disabled students. The "Falcucci Document", issued in 1975, was one of the most advanced studies of disability issues at both the European and international level, promoting a new way of thinking about the issue. The document stated that "... school brings educational action and potential of each student, and looks as the most appropriate structure to overcome the conditions of marginalization that would otherwise be condemned children with disabilities ..."

She died on 4 September 2014. Her niece Alessandra assisted her during the end of her life.

Notes

External links

20th-century Italian women politicians
1926 births
2014 deaths
Politicians from Rome
Christian Democracy (Italy) politicians
Members of the Senate of the Republic (Italy)
Education ministers of Italy
Women government ministers of Italy
Women members of the Senate of the Republic (Italy)